

Bandy

World Championship
 January 27 – February 3: 2013 Bandy World Championship in  Vänersborg
 Division A:  defeated , 4–3, to win their seventh overall Bandy World Championship title.  took the bronze medal.
 Division B:  defeated , 4–2, in the final, and is qualified for Division A next year.  took third place.

World Cup
 Final game, 2012 Bandy World Cup, October: Zorky Krasnogorsk (Russia) defeated Yenisey Krasnoyarsk (Russia), 3–0

World Cup Women
 Final game, 2012 Bandy World Cup Women, October: won by Rekord Irkutsk (Russia)

National champions
 Finland: Helsinki IFK (men), Veitsiluodon Vastus (women)
 Norway: Ullevål IL (men), Drammen Bandy (women)
 Russia: Dynamo Moscow (men)
 Sweden: Hammarby IF (men), Sandvikens AIK (women)
 Ukraine: Avangard Budy (men)
 United States: Dynamo Duluth (men)

International Youth Championships
 G17 World Championship
 Winner:  Sweden
 U17 World Championship
 Winner:  Finland
 U23 World Championship
 Winner:  Russia

Bobsleigh and skeleton

 2012–13 Bobsleigh World Cup
Two-man overall winner:  Lyndon Rush
Four-man overall winner:  Alexandr Zubkov
Two-women overall winner:  Kaillie Humphries
 2012–13 Skeleton World Cup
Men's overall winner:  Martins Dukurs
Women's overall winner:  Marion Thees
 The FIBT World Championships 2013 took place at the St. Moritz-Celerina Olympic Bobrun at St. Moritz, Switzerland.
Two-man bobsleigh winner:  Francesco Friedrich / Jannis Bäcker
Four-man bobsleigh winner:  Maximilian Arndt / Marko Hübenbecker / Alexander Rödiger / Martin Putze
Two-women bobsleigh winner:  Kaillie Humphries / Chelsea Valois
Men's skeleton winner:  Aleksandr Tretyakov
Women's skeleton winner:  Shelley Rudman

Curling

Season of Champions
Canada Cup of Curling (Moose Jaw, Saskatchewan, November 28 – December 2)
Men's winner:  Jeff Stoughton def.  Glenn Howard
Women's winner:  Stefanie Lawton def.  Kaitlyn Lawes
Continental Cup of Curling (Penticton, British Columbia, 10–13 January)
Winner: Team North America
M&M Meat Shops Canadian Junior Curling Championships (Fort McMurray, Alberta, 31 January – 10 February)
Men's winner:  (Matt Dunstone, skip)
Women's winner:  (Corryn Brown, skip)
Scotties Tournament of Hearts (Kingston, Ontario, 16–24 February)
Winner:  (Rachel Homan, skip)
Tim Hortons Brier (Edmonton, Alberta, March 2–10)
Winner:  (Brad Jacobs, skip)

Grand slams
Curlers Corner Autumn Gold Curling Classic (Calgary, Alberta, October 5–8)
Women's winner:  Sherry Middaugh def.  Rachel Homan
Manitoba Lotteries Women's Curling Classic (Winnipeg, Manitoba, October 19–22)
Women's winner:  Stefanie Lawton def.  Rachel Homan
Colonial Square Ladies Classic (Saskatoon, Saskatchewan, November 9–12)
Women's winner:  Stefanie Lawton def.  Chelsea Carey
The Masters Grand Slam of Curling (Brantford, Ontario, November 14–18)
Men's winner:  Kevin Koe def.  Jim Cotter
Women's winner:  Rachel Homan def.  Chelsea Carey
Canadian Open of Curling (Kelowna, British Columbia, December 12–16)
Men's winner:  Glenn Howard def.  Brad Jacobs
The Pomeroy Inn & Suites National (Port Hawkesbury, Nova Scotia, 23–27 January)
Winner:  Jeff Stoughton (skip)
The Players' Championship (Toronto, Ontario, April 16–21)
Men's winner:  Glenn Howard
Women's winner:  Eve Muirhead

World championships
World Wheelchair Curling Championship (Sochi, Russia, 16–23 February)
Winner:  (Jim Armstrong, skip)
World Junior Curling Championships (Sochi, Russia, 28 February – 10 March)
Men's winner:  (Kyle Smith, skip)
Women's winner:  (Alina Kovaleva, skip)
World Women's Curling Championship (Riga, Latvia, March 16–24)
Winner:  (Eve Muirhead, skip)
World Men's Curling Championship (Victoria, British Columbia, March 30 – April 7)
 Winner:  (Niklas Edin, skip)
World Senior Curling Championships (Fredericton, New Brunswick, April 13–20)
 Men's winner:  (Rob Armitage, skip)
 Women's winner:  (Cathy King, skip)
World Mixed Doubles Curling Championship (Fredericton, New Brunswick, April 13–20)
 Winner:  Zsolt Kiss / Dorottya Palancsa

Figure skating

 21–27 January: 2013 European Figure Skating Championships in Zagreb, Croatia
Men:  Javier Fernandez (first title).
Ladies:  Carolina Kostner (fifth title).
Pairs:  Tatiana Volosozhar / Maxim Trankov (second title).
Ice dance:  Ekaterina Bobrova / Dmitri Soloviev (first title).
 5–10 February: 2013 Four Continents Figure Skating Championships in Osaka, Japan
Men:  Kevin Reynolds (first title).
Ladies:  Mao Asada (third title).
Pairs:  Meagan Duhamel / Eric Radford (first title).
Ice dance:  Meryl Davis / Charlie White (third title).
 25 February – 3 March: 2013 World Junior Figure Skating Championships in Milan, Italy
Men:  Joshua Farris (first title).
Ladies:  Elena Radionova (first title).
Pairs:  Haven Denney / Brandon Frazier (first title).
Ice dance:  Alexandra Stepanova / Ivan Bukin (first title).
 March 10 – 17: 2013 World Figure Skating Championships in London, Ontario, Canada
Men:  Patrick Chan (third consecutive title).
Ladies:  Yuna Kim (second title).
Pairs:  Tatiana Volosozhar / Maxim Trankov (first title).
Ice dance:  Meryl Davis / Charlie White (second title).
 April 11 – 14: 2013 ISU World Team Trophy in Figure Skating in Tokyo
Team Champions: ; Second: ; Third:

Ice hockey

 26 December – 5 January: 2013 World Junior Ice Hockey Championships in Russia
The  defeated defending champion  3–1 to win their third title. John Gibson was named MVP of the tournament.
 29 December – 5 January: 2013 IIHF World Women's U18 Championship in Finland
 defeats the  2–1 in overtime to win their third title.
 April 2 – 9: 2013 IIHF Women's World Championship in Canada
The  defeated  3–2 to claim its fifth title in this championship.
 April 18 – 28: 2013 IIHF World U18 Championships in Russia
 defeats the  3–2 to claim its third title in this event.
 May 3 – 19: 2013 IIHF World Championship in Sweden and Finland
 defeated  5–1 to win its ninth title for this championship.  Roman Josi, of the NHL's Nashville Predators, was named MVP of the tournament.
 June 12 – 24: 2013 Stanley Cup Finals
 Winner:  Chicago Blackhawks (fifth title).

Luge

 24 November 2012 – 24 February 2013: 2012–13 Luge World Cup
  won all the gold medals in the four events for this sport.
 1–2 February: The FIL World Luge Championships 2013 were held at the Whistler Sliding Centre in Canada
  won the gold and overall medal tallies.

Short-track speed skating

 19 October 2012 – 12 February 2013: 2012–13 ISU Short Track Speed Skating World Cup
  won both the gold and overall medal tallies.
 March 8 – 10: The 2013 World Short Track Speed Skating Championships took place at the Főnix Hall, in Debrecen, Hungary
  won both the gold and overall medal tallies.

Speed skating (long-track)

 16 November 2012 – 10 March 2013: 2012–13 ISU Speed Skating World Cup
  won both the gold and overall medal tallies.
 26–27 January: The 2013 World Sprint Speed Skating Championships were held at the Utah Olympic Oval, in Salt Lake City, United States
 Men's winner:  Michel Mulder (first title).
 Women's winner:  Heather Richardson (first title).
 15–16 February: The 2013 World Allround Speed Skating Championships were held at the Vikingskipet (Hamar Olympic Hall), in Hamar, Norway
 Men's winner:  Sven Kramer (sixth title).
 Women's winner:  Ireen Wüst (fourth title).
 21–24 March: The 2013 World Single Distance Speed Skating Championships were held at the Adler Arena Skating Center, in Sochi, Russia
  won both the gold and overall medal tallies.

References

External links
 Federation of International Bandy
 The International Bobsleigh and Skeleton Federation
 World Curling Federation
 International Skating Union
 International Ice Hockey Federation
 International Luge Federation

Ice sports
Ice sports by year
Ice sports